WJOX (690 kHz, "Jox 3") is a commercial AM radio station licensed to Birmingham, Alabama.  It is owned by Cumulus Media and broadcasts a sports radio format.  WJOX is the Birmingham affiliate of the UAB Blazers Radio Network (baseball only), the Tennessee Titans Radio Network and the Atlanta Braves Radio Network.  It used to be the broadcast home of the Birmingham Barons.  The station has studios and offices in Homewood.

By day, WJOX broadcasts at 50,000 watts, the maximum for commercial AM stations.  But because AM 690 is a Canadian and Mexican clear channel frequency, WJOX must significantly drop its power at sunset to 500 watts to avoid interference.  It also uses a directional antenna at night.  The transmitter is off Alabama State Route 5 (Bessemer Super Highway) at Cairo Avenue in Midfield, Alabama.  WJOX is Alabama's primary entry point station for the Emergency Alert System.

Cumulus Media owns three sports stations in the Birmingham area.  94.5 WJOX-FM carries local sports shows as well as programming from the CBS Sports Radio Network.  100.5 WJQX in Helena is an affiliate of ESPN Radio and calls itself "Jox 2."  And 690 WJOX carries the Fox Sports Radio Network, using the moniker "Jox 3."  The call sign refers to "Jocks," slang for athletes or the athletic supporter they wear.

History
The station that now broadcasts from 690 AM in Birmingham signed on in 1947 as WVOK.  It was the first radio station in Birmingham to broadcast with 50,000 watts.  Due to Federal Communications Commission restrictions, the station broadcast only during daytime hours.  It was not until the early 1980s that WVOK was able to broadcast 24 hours a day.  690 AM is a Canadian and Mexican clear-channel frequency.

Throughout the 1960s and into the 1970s, WVOK was a Top 40 station calling itself "The Mighty 690" with a signal that covered almost all of north and central Alabama, as well as parts of Mississippi, Georgia and Tennessee.  Rather than attempting to compete with crosstown station (and market leader) WSGN, WVOK targeted listeners in the rural areas of the states its signal reached.  One of the most popular promotions of WVOK was their "Shower of Stars" concert series.  Throughout the 1960s and 1970s, these concerts brought such performers as the Rolling Stones, Jerry Lee Lewis, Neil Diamond and the Beach Boys to Birmingham.

In 1976, WVOK dropped Top 40 music and became a country station using the nickname OK 69.  At about the same time, sister station WVOK-FM (now WZRR) signed on with an album rock format.  Country music on WVOK continued until 1985, when the station changed to adult contemporary music before moving to an oldies format.  In 1989, oldies were dropped, and the station began playing classic country music.

During the late 1980s and early 1990s, several AM stations in Birmingham debuted afternoon sports talk call-in shows.  Local sportswriter Paul Finebaum had debuted a popular show on WAPI.  In 1990, Herb Winches, a former TV sports anchor on WBRC and WVTM, moved his own popular show with co-host Ben Cook from WERC to WVOK.  Because Winches' show was fairly successful, and because, by the 1990s, there were few AM radio stations that were successful playing music, station management made the decision to launch an all-sports station in 1992.

On November 29, 2006, WJOX began simulcasting on the 100.5 FM frequency of sister station WRAX. On December 1, the AM station changed its call letters to WSPZ, and the WJOX call sign moved to the FM station.  On January 8, 2007, WJOX-FM and WSPZ began separate sports programming schedules.  Three of the local call-in shows from the former WJOX moved to FM, and a new morning-drive show was created, reuniting former WJOX morning drive personalities Matt Coulter and Scott Griffin.  As a result of the change, and to differentiate itself from WJOX, an affiliate of ESPN Radio, WSPZ affiliated with Fox Sports Radio.  Coulter was let go by WSPZ on January 22, 2008, when his contract was not renewed.  Scott Griffin was fired on July 17, 2008, and his show was replaced with syndicated sports talk, then Don Imus's nationally syndicated morning show.

The station returned to the WJOX call sign on February 8, 2010, and simulcasted WJOX-FM 94.5.

On January 1, 2012, WJOX split from its simulcast with WJOX-FM 94.5 and rebranded as "690 The Fan". The station currently airs programming from the Fox Sports Radio Network.  In 2013, the station was once again rebranded as "Jox 3".

The station airs 10 University of Alabama at Birmingham baseball games each season as part of the Blazers ISP Sports Network.

Programming
All the programming is from Fox Sports Radio.

Previous logo

References

External links
FCC History Cards for WJOX

Sports radio stations in the United States
JOX
Radio stations established in 1947
1947 establishments in Alabama
CBS Sports Radio stations
Cumulus Media radio stations